The Sydney University Musical Society (SUMS) is an undergraduate choral society at the University of Sydney. Founded in 1878, it is one of the oldest secular choirs in Australia, and the oldest Australian University Choir.

SUMS has performed many great works over its lifetime, including the Australian premiere performances Bach's Mass in B minor and St Matthew Passion in 1880; premiere performances of Martin and Peter Wesley Smith's Songs of Australia for the Australian Bicentenary in 1988, the world premiere of Nicholas Routley's Mycenae Lookout in 1998, and world premiere of Anne Boyd's carol, A Lullaby of the Nativity, written for SUMS in 2003. The Musical Society has performed with orchestras such as the Sydney Symphony Orchestra, the Sydney Youth Orchestra and the SBS Youth Orchestra. SUMS' conductor of 23 years, Ben Macpherson, retired from his post of musical director in mid-2006, with his final performance with the society being Mendelssohn's Elijah, performed in the Great Hall of the University of Sydney.

In 2015, SUMS also hosted the 66th Annual Intervarsity Festival, delivering an astounding performance of Verdi's Messa da Requiem. Outside of rehearsals and performances, SUMS regularly hosts events for its members as well, including picnics, trivia nights at the pub, camps, and the annual Academic Dinner.

Recent SUMS Performances 

∞ Collaborate with Sydney Conservatorium of Music Symphony Orchestra, Choir and Chamber Choir

† Collaborate with Sydney University Symphony Orchestra

See also 
Australian Intervarsity Choral Societies Association

References

External links 
 Official Site

University of Sydney
Music organisations based in Australia
Musical groups established in 1878
1878 establishments in Australia
University choirs
Choral societies